Europrotomus schroeckingeri  is an extinct species of fossil true conch from the Middle Miocene.

References

Strombidae
Fossil taxa described in 1884